Farrokhabad may refer to:

Alborz Province
Farrokhabad, Alborz, a village in Karaj County

Chaharmahal and Bakhtiari Province
 Farrokhabad, Chaharmahal and Bakhtiari, a village in Kuhrang County

Ilam Province
Farrokhabad, Dehloran
Farrokhabad, Zarrinabad, Dehloran County

Kerman Province
Farrokhabad, Anbarabad, a village in Anbarabad County
Farrokhabad, Esmaili, a village in Anbarabad County
Farrokhabad, Rafsanjan, a village in Rafsanjan County

Lorestan Province
Farrokhabad-e Olya, Delfan
Farrokhabad-e Olya, Kuhdasht
Farrokhabad-e Sofla

Razavi Khorasan Province
Farrokhabad, Mashhad
Farrokhabad, Nishapur